The follicular antrum is the portion of an ovarian follicle filled with follicular fluid. Appearance of the follicular antrum during follicular maturation is the first sign that a follicle has reached the next stage of maturation. It has changed from a primary follicle to a secondary follicle.

See also
 Antrum

External links
  "Graafian Follicle"
  - "Mammal, canine ovary (LM, High)"
 Description at okstate.edu

Mammal female reproductive system